The Geely Xingrui or Geely Preface is a mid-size sedan produced by Geely for China since 2020. It was revealed in September 2020 at Auto China.

Overview

The Geely Xingrui was first previewed by the Preface concept at Auto Shanghai in April 2019. 

The production model, originally referred to as the Preface, was revealed in September 2020 at the 2020 Auto China event in Beijing, China as the Xingrui.

Specifications

References

Geely vehicles
Cars of China
Cars introduced in 2020
Sedans
Mid-size cars
Front-wheel-drive vehicles